Mari Chordà Recasens (born 1942 in Amposta, Catalonia) is an artist, painter, poet and a Catalan feminist socio-cultural activist. Her work has been exhibited in The World goes pop, at Tate Modern.

Exhibitions

In the past decade, two retrospective exhibitions of the work of him were held: 
 Mari Chordà. Passar y trasspasar 1960-2000, in charge of Marisa Díez de la Fuente, in Amposta (2000), also in Tortosa. 
 Vengo de una zona húmeda. Mary Chordà, in charge of Marta Darder. Women's Culture Center Francesca Bonnemaison, Barcelona.
The World goes Pop, Tate Modern, London, 2015.

References

Women artists from Catalonia
1942 births
Living people
20th-century Spanish women artists
21st-century Spanish women artists